Ylli Shehu (born February 24, 1981, Kukës, Albania) is a Member of the Assembly of Albania. Shehu is a lawyer by profession; he graduated from the University of Tirana.

References

Albanian politicians
1981 births
Living people